Crandall is an English surname. It is likely a geographic feature name deriving from the Anglo-Saxon, "crundel," meaning hollow, ravine, or water-course.

Notable people with the surname

Bradley Crandall (1927–1991), radio personality, US
Bruce Perry Crandall (born 1933), soldier and Medal of Honor recipient, US
Charles Henry Crandall (1858–1923), author and poet, US
Charles M. Crandall (1826–1867), physician and politician, US
Charles Martin Crandall (1833–1905), inventor and toymaker, US
Del Crandall (1930–2021), baseball player and manager, US
Duane Crandall (born 1946), politician, Canada
Elizabeth Walbert Crandall (1914–2005), academic, US
Harrison R. Crandall (1887–1970), photographer and painter, US
Harry Crandall (1879–1937), businessman, US
J'aime Crandall (born 1982), ballet dancer, US
James Otis Crandall (1887–1951), baseball player, US
Jesse Armour Crandall (1834–1920), inventor and toymaker, US
John Crandall (1609–1676), early settler of Rhode Island, US
John Gardner Crandall Jr. (1931–2008), American football coach, US
Joseph Crandall (ca 1761–1858), Baptist minister and political figure in New Brunswick, Canada
Keith A. Crandall (born 1965), computational biologist, bioinformaticist, and population geneticist, US
Lauren Crandall (born 1985), field hockey player, US<ref>
Lee Saunders Crandall (1887–1969), ornithologist and General Curator of Bronx Zoo, US
Louis Eugene Crandall (1929–2016), printer and entrepreneur, US
Lucien Stephen Crandall (1844–1889), inventor, US
Lynn Crandall (1888–1964), civil engineer, US
Martin Lesley Crandall (born 1975), keyboardist, US
Michael Grain Crandall (born 1940), mathematician, US
Orson Leon Crandall (1903–1960), soldier and Medal of Honor recipient, US
Prudence Crandall (c. 1803 – 1890), schoolteacher and activist, US
Reed Leonard Crandall (1917–1982), illustrator of comic books and magazines, US
Richard Crandall (1947–2012), computer scientist and physicist, US
Robert Lloyd Crandall (born 1935), businessman, US
Rodolph Crandall (1832–1922), politician and soldier, US
Roland Crandall (1892–1972), animator, US
Stephen Harry Crandall (1920–2013), professor emeritus of mechanical engineering, US

Fictional characters
Captain Crandall, leader of Teamo Supremo
Lt. Rip Crandall, character played by Jack Lemmon in The Wackiest Ship in the Army
Lt. Dolores Crandall, character in Operation Petticoat
Lennart Crandall, character in Johnny Cool
Bob "Lightnin'" Crandall, character played by Bob Steele in Lightnin' Crandall
Corky Crandall, character in sitcom Makin' It
Sam Crandall, character in The FBI Story
George Crandall (disambiguation), multiple characters
Ellen Crandall, character played by Dorothy Neuman in Perry Mason, episode #44 "The Case of the Curious Bride"
Jack Crandall, character played by Dwayne Hickman in My Dog, The Thief
Sheriff Vic Crandall, character played by Barry Kelley in sitcom Petticoat Junction
Sheriff Lucky Crandall, character played by Russell Hayden in A Tornado in the Saddle
Sir Crispin Crandall, character played by Harris Yulin, The Blacklist, episode "Sir Crispin Crandall
Monte Crandall, character played by James Ellison in The Ghost Goes Wild
Lawrence and Betty Crandall, characters played by Harry Hayden and Donna Martell in Abbott and Costello Meet the Killer, Boris Karloff
Jim Crandal, character played by James Britton in The Yesterday Machine

See also
Crandall v. Nevada (1868), U.S. Supreme Court case
Crandell (disambiguation)

References

English-language surnames
Surnames of British Isles origin